Sabine Hass (8 April 1949 in Braunschweig – 17 February 1999 in Klagenfurt) was a German operatic soprano, who appeared internationally, especially as a Wagner and Strauss singer, including the role of Senta in Der fliegende Holländer at the Bayreuth Festival.

References

Bibliography 
 Karl-Josef Kutsch, Leo Riemens: Großes Sängerlexikon. Munich 1999.

External links 
 
 

1949 births
1999 deaths
Musicians from Braunschweig
German operatic sopranos
20th-century German women  opera singers